Persoonia iogyna is a species of flowering plant in the family Proteaceae and is endemic to south-eastern Queensland. It is an erect shrub or small tree with hairy young branchlets, narrow elliptical to lance-shaped leaves, yellow flowers and green fruit.

Description

Taxonomy
Persoonia iogyna was first formally described in 1994 by Peter Weston and Lawrie Johnson from material collected near Mount Nebo in 1990.

Distribution and habitat

Conservation status
Persoonia iogyna is classified as of "least concrn" under the Queensland Government Nature Conservation Act 1992.

References

iogyna
Flora of Queensland
Plants described in 1994
Taxa named by Peter H. Weston
Taxa named by Lawrence Alexander Sidney Johnson